Swe Zin Htet (born 16 November 1999) is a Burmese model and beauty pageant titleholder who was crowned Miss Universe Myanmar 2019.

In November 2019, Swe Zin Htet came out as a lesbian, and later that year she became the first openly lesbian woman to compete in a Miss Universe competition. Julia Lemigova of the Soviet Union competed in Miss Universe 1991, Patricia Yurena Rodríguez of Spain competed in the Miss Universe 2013 competition, and Tashi Choden of Bhutan who will compete in Miss Universe 2022 but did not come out until after the competition.

Pageantry

Swe Zin Htet had previously begun her pageantry career after winning Miss Supranational Myanmar 2016; she placed in the top ten and won Miss Personality title at Miss Supranational 2016.

Miss Universe Myanmar
On May 31, 2019, Swe Zin Htet was crowned as Miss Universe Myanmar 2019 by previous titleholder Hnin Thway Yu Aung. She will be Myanmar's next representative to Miss Universe.

Miss Universe 2019

As Miss Universe Myanmar, she represented Myanmar in the Miss Universe 2019 competition. At the end of event, she was unplaced.

Personal life
She has been in a relationship with singer Gae Gae.

References

External links

1999 births
Burmese beauty pageant winners
Burmese female models
Lesbians
Burmese LGBT people
LGBT models
Living people
Miss Universe 2019 contestants
Miss Universe Myanmar winners
People from Kayin State